The term insertion symbol has more than one meaning,,
 when using a cursor (user interface), it is (usually) a vertical bar indicating where text being typed will be inserted 
 a caret (proofreading) is a V-shaped grapheme, usually inverted and sometimes extended, used to indicate that additional material needs to be inserted at this point in the text.

See also
 Caret (computing)

Typographical symbols